David John Roberts (born 1 October 1942) is an English former first-class cricketer.

The son of the cricketer and umpire Edward Allen Roberts, he was born at Harpenden in October 1942. He made a single appearance in first-class cricket for the Marylebone Cricket Club (MCC) against Scotland at Glasgow in 1963. Batting once in the match, he was dismissed for 6 runs in the MCC first-innings by Ronald Hogan. The following year he played minor counties cricket for Hertfordshire, making three appearances in the Minor Counties Championship.

References

External links

1942 births
Living people
People from Harpenden
English cricketers
Marylebone Cricket Club cricketers
Hertfordshire cricketers